Bryan Scott Baker (born December 2, 1994) is an American professional baseball pitcher for the Baltimore Orioles of Major League Baseball (MLB). He has also played in MLB for the Toronto Blue Jays and he made his MLB debut in 2021.

Amateur career
Baker grew up in Fort Walton Beach, Florida and attended Choctawhatchee High School. Baker was selected in the 40th round of the 2013 Major League Baseball Draft by the Pittsburgh Pirates, but opted not to sign.

Baker played college baseball for the North Florida Ospreys for three seasons. He was named first team All-Atlantic Sun Conference as a junior after posting a 6–4 record and a conference-leading 2.27 ERA with 80 strikeouts. Baker compiled a 14–10 record with a 3.67 ERA and 144 strikeouts over the course of his collegiate career. In 2015, he played collegiate summer baseball with the Bourne Braves of the Cape Cod Baseball League.

Professional career

Colorado Rockies
Baker was drafted by the Colorado Rockies in the 11th round of the 2016 Major League Baseball Draft. After signing with the team he was assigned to the Rookie league Grand Junction Rockies. Baker spent the 2017 season with the Asheville Tourists of the Class A South Atlantic League, where he was moved to the bullpen and posted a 1.66 ERA on the season. Baker began the 2018 season with the Class A-Advanced Lancaster JetHawks.

Toronto Blue Jays
Baker was acquired by the Toronto Blue Jays on August 14, 2018, as the player to be named later to complete a trade for Seung-hwan Oh. The Blue Jays assigned him to the Dunedin Blue Jays of the Class A-Advanced Florida State League where he had a 2.84 ERA over six appearances. Baker began the 2019 season with the Double-A New Hampshire Fisher Cats before being promoted to the Triple-A Buffalo Bisons, where he had a 3.68 ERA and 31 strikeouts in 22 innings pitched. Baker did not play in 2020 due to the cancellation of the minor league season caused by the COVID-19 pandemic, but was assigned to the Blue Jays' Alternate Training Site. He returned to the Buffalo Bisons to start the 2021 minor league season.

On September 1, 2021, Baker was selected to the 40-man roster and promoted to the major leagues for the first time. On September 5, Baker made his MLB debut, tossing a scoreless inning against the Oakland Athletics, striking out one.

Baltimore Orioles
On November 8, 2021, Baker was claimed off waivers by the Baltimore Orioles. 

On April 23, 2022, Baker earned his first career win in a 5–4 victory over the Los Angeles Angels. On September 6, after surrendering two hits and a run to the Toronto Blue Jays, he instigated a benches clearing scrum by staring at the Blue Jays dugout while making a hand puppet-like gesture with his right hand.

References

External links

North Florida Ospreys bio

1994 births
Living people
People from Fort Walton Beach, Florida
Baseball players from Florida
Major League Baseball pitchers
Toronto Blue Jays players
Baltimore Orioles players
North Florida Ospreys baseball players
Bourne Braves players
Grand Junction Rockies players
Asheville Tourists players
Lancaster JetHawks players
Dunedin Blue Jays players
New Hampshire Fisher Cats players
Buffalo Bisons (minor league) players